"Blood Count'' is a 1967 jazz composition by Billy Strayhorn. It was originally meant for a three-piece work Strayhorn was writing for Duke Ellington and initially titled "Blue Cloud". However, Strayhorn was hospitalized in 1967 due to cancer and finished the composition while in the hospital. He died on 31 May and "Blood Count" was his last finished composition. The Ellington orchestra debuted "Blood Count" at a Carnegie Hall concert in March, this was later released as The Greatest Jazz Concert in the World. In August 1967 Ellington recorded the tune on his tribute album for Strayhorn, ...And His Mother Called Him Bill. Although Ellington never played the tune again after the recording session, many other artists have since recorded it, including Stan Getz, Jimmy Rowles, Joe Henderson and Bobby Watson. "Blood Count" was a part of the repertoire for the 2013 Essentially Ellington competition.

Notes 

1967 compositions
Jazz compositions
Compositions by Billy Strayhorn